The School of Economics and Business (SEB LU) in Ljubljana is part of the University of Ljubljana and was founded in 1946. It was one of the first faculties in the country to establish new internationally comparable Bologna 3+2 programs in 2005. In 2006 it was awarded EQUIS accreditation. In 2010 the school received business accreditation from AACSB International. Six years later, the school also received  AMBA accreditation. With the addition of the AMBA accreditation, the school became one of 77 business schools in the world to hold the Triple Crown accreditation.

Full-time programs in English 
School of Economics and Business offers various undergraduate and graduate programs in business and economics in Slovenian and English. This enables Slovenian students and foreigners to study in Slovenia in either language.

Undergraduate program 
The school offers a degree in business and economics with two specializations:

 Marketing
 International business

Master's programs 
 Master in International Business
 Master in Bank and Financial Management (Double degree)
 Master in Money and Finance (Double degree)
 Master in Economics (Double degree)
 Master in Business Informatics (Information Management) (Double degree)
 Master in Logistics/Supply Chain Management
 International Full Time Master Program in Business Administration (IMB)
 European Master in Tourism Management (Joint program)
 Master in Business Administration in Co-operation with the ICPE
 International Business Academy – Macedonia
 Public Sector and Environmental Economics (JMPSE) (Joint triple degree program)

Doctoral program 
 Doctoral Program in Economics and Business

Executive education 

This program allows employed executives to refine their knowledge at the school.

Open courses 

Open development programs target general needs and address issues facing organizations, as assessed from clients' needs and suggestions. Each program is headed by a program director and is run jointly with other schools.

The open course portfolio includes the following areas of specialization
 general management;
 conducting business in foreign languages;
 informatics and organization;
 leadership and personal development;
 finance;
 accounting and controlling;
 marketing; and
 special topics (e.g., EU Projects/Funds, Legal Issues).

Company specific programs 

Programs are provided for individual organizations. An additional program, titled “Business Academy”, is designed as a management development tool for top executives, middle managers or aspiring young managers.

Research 

Researchers and activities are organised within the Research Centre at the School of Economics and Business and fifteen applied research institutes.

The School of Economics and Business’ researchers regularly participate at scientific and professional conferences, produce monographs and publish in international scientific and professional journals such as the Journal of Business Finance & Accounting, the Academy of Management Review and Interactive Learning Environments.

Links and references 

Economics schools
Economics
Educational institutions established in 1946
1946 establishments in Yugoslavia